Vilkhivka rural territorial hromada is a hromada (municipality) in Ukraine, in Kharkiv Raion of Kharkiv Oblast. The administrative center is the village of Vilkhivka.

During the 2022 Russian invasion of Ukraine, Vilkhivka was conquered by the Russian troops, but was later retaken March 27 by the Ukrainian army.

Settlements 
The municipality consists of 16 villages.

References

External links 
 

Kharkiv Raion
Hromadas of Kharkiv Oblast
2020 establishments in Ukraine